Ad Astra is an annual science fiction fantasy and horror convention in Ontario. Major events of the convention include the Masquerade, Guest of Honour presentations, panel discussions, Art Show, and Dealer's Room, as well as a wide variety of privately run room parties. Other events on the convention program include a games room, book launches, and the Saturday evening dance.

Programming

Ad Astra's programming features a wide variety of discussion panels on various topics of interest to science fiction and fantasy fans. Writing, art, and costuming workshops are also often seen each year at the convention.

History

Ad Astra first ran in 1980, and has run every year since, excepting 1981, 1999 and 2020. The convention occasionally serves as host for other conventions; for example, Canvention 7 was held as part of Ad Astra 7, in 1987, and the convention hosted the Toronto games convention Orion for the years 2003 and 2004.

In previous years, guests have included prominent Canadian writers including Robert J. Sawyer, Nalo Hopkinson, Tanya Huff, Guy Gavriel Kay, Robert Charles Wilson, Phyllis Gotlieb, etc., as well as internationally renowned authors including C. J. Cherryh, David Brin, Connie Willis, Stephen Hunt, Larry Niven, Lois McMaster Bujold, Frederik Pohl, Katherine Kurtz, Orson Scott Card, James P. Hogan and others. Ad Astra has continued to evolve past its focus on literature to include programming dedicated to costuming, art, filking, and media. In some years, Jason Taniguchi has performed popular one-man parody shows at the convention.

Event history

See also
 Toronto
 Canadian science fiction

References

External links
 Official Site

Science fiction conventions in Canada
Events in Toronto
Fantasy conventions